Bharati Nandi Sarkar is a Awami League politician and a Member of the Bangladesh Parliament from a reserved seat.

Career
Sarkar was elected to parliament from reserved seat as a Awami League candidate in 1996. She served in the Standing Committee on Food Ministry.

References

Awami League politicians
Living people
Women members of the Jatiya Sangsad
7th Jatiya Sangsad members
Year of birth missing (living people)
20th-century Bangladeshi women politicians